The 1919 Alabama Crimson Tide baseball team represented the Alabama Crimson Tide of the University of Alabama in the 1919 NCAA baseball season, winning the SIAA championship.

Schedule and results

References

Alabama Crimson Tide
Alabama Crimson Tide baseball seasons
Southern Intercollegiate Athletic Association baseball champion seasons
1919 in sports in Alabama